Orientation may refer to:

Positioning in physical space
 Map orientation, the relationship between directions on a map and compass directions
 Orientation (housing), the position of a building with respect to the sun, a concept in building design
 Orientation of churches,  the architectural feature of facing ("orienting"), churches towards the east (Latin: oriens)
 Coin orientation, a description of the orientation of opposite faces of a coin with respect to one another
 Page orientation, the way in which a rectangular page is oriented for normal viewing
 In Animal navigation, turning the body to a desired heading, e.g. in the correct direction of migration
 Orientation (sign language), the orientation of the hands when signing

Arts and media 
 Orientation (EP), a 2001 album by Sonata Arctica
 Orientation (film), a 1996 short film produced by the Church of Scientology
 "Orientation" (Lost), a 2005 episode of American television series Lost
 "Orientación", an episode of the American television series Prison Break
 "Orientation" (Heroes), a 2009 episode of American television series Heroes
 Orientation (Agents of S.H.I.E.L.D.), an episode of the American television series Agents of S.H.I.E.L.D.

Mathematics 
 Orientation (geometry), the direction in which a geometrical object is pointed
 Orientation (space), the choice, in a space, between "clockwise" and "counterclockwise"
 Orientation (vector space), the specific case of linear algebra
 Orientability, a property of a geometrical space which allows choosing an orientation, that is, distinguishing an object in the space from its mirror image
 Orientation character, a character of the fundamental group that "measures" the orientability of a manifold. 
 Curve orientation, the choice of a direction for a point moving on a curve
 Orientation (graph theory), an assignment of a direction (orientation) to each edge of an undirected graph

Other uses
 Orientation (mental), a function of the mind
 Romantic orientation, the sex or gender with which a person is most likely to have a romantic relationship or fall in love
 Sexual orientation, the direction of an individual's sexuality with respect to the sex of the persons the individual finds sexually attractive
 Student orientation, the first week of a university year in several countries

See also 
 Oriented (film), a 2015 documentary film
 Orientation tensor, a tool in geology/earth sciences
 Orienteering, a sport involving map orientation
 Orientation and Mobility